Teerlinck is a surname. Notable people with the surname include:

Hilde Teerlinck (born 1966), Belgian curator
John Teerlinck (1951–2020), American football player and coach

See also
Teerlinc, surname
Teerlink, surname